Adam Sztark (30 July 1907 - 19 December 1942) was a Polish clergyman and rector of the Jesuit church in Słonim who was murdered by the Nazis for his work helping Jews and refugees during World War II. He was the first Polish Jesuit to be honored with the title of Righteous Among the Nations.

Sztark was born on 30 July 1907 to a Polish family, the oldest of four children. His parents were merchants and craftsmen. When he was young, he lived in Kalisz, which had a large Jewish population at the time. After suffering a hand injury he gave up on his plans to become an officer, so after finishing junior high school he joined the Jesuit Order in Stara Wieś in 1924 instead. He then became ordained as a priest in June 1936, and went on to work as an administrator at the Zhyrovichy Monastery in Polesie. As chaplain of the Congregation of the Sisters of the Immaculate Conception of the Blessed Virgin Mary, he worked with the nuns of the convent to help hide Jews during Nazi occupation of Słonim. At the pulipt, he urged his parishoners to help persecuted Jews, and organized the collection of money and food for Jews and refugees, as well as collection of golden crosses to help Jews pay the tax levied by the Nazis. Eventually on 18 December 1942 he was arrested by the Gestapo, and murdered the next day alongside nuns Marta Wołowska and Bogumiła Noiszewska who helped his efforts.

On 8 March 2001 he was posthumously honored with the title Righteous Among the Nations by Yad Vashem. In 2003 the beatification process of him and 121 other Polish Catholics began.

See also 

 108 Blessed Polish Martyrs

References 

1907 births
1942 deaths
Polish Righteous Among the Nations
19th-century Polish Jesuits